Claude Cormier  (born June 22, 1960) is a landscape architect from Quebec. The majority of his projects are located in Montreal and Toronto.

See also
 18 Shades of Gay, Montreal

References 

1960 births
Living people
Urban designers
Canadian landscape architects
Canadian architects
Knights of the National Order of Quebec
Harvard Graduate School of Design alumni
University of Guelph alumni
University of Toronto alumni
French Quebecers
LGBT architects
Members of the Royal Canadian Academy of Arts